Oliver J. Marmol (born July 2, 1986) is an American professional baseball manager and former coach who is the manager of the St. Louis Cardinals of Major League Baseball (MLB). As of the 2022 season, he is the youngest manager of an MLB team.

Career
Marmol attended Dr. Phillips High School in Orlando, Florida, and was drafted by the Pittsburgh Pirates in the 31st round of the 2004 MLB draft. He did not sign with the Pirates and attended the College of Charleston, where he played college baseball for the College of Charleston Cougars. He batted .327 in three seasons with the Cougars, and was drafted by the St. Louis Cardinals in the sixth round of the 2007 MLB draft. He played in the Cardinals organization for four seasons, batting .203 as a utility player for the Batavia Muckdogs of the Class A-Short Season New York-Penn League, the Quad Cities River Bandits of the Class A Midwest League, and the Palm Beach Cardinals of the Class A-Advanced Florida State League.

In 2011, Marmol became the hitting coach of the Gulf Coast Cardinals of the Rookie-level Gulf Coast League. The next season, he became manager of the Johnson City Cardinals of the Rookie-level Appalachian League, and led the team to the postseason. In 2013, he managed the State College Spikes of the New York-Penn League. He returned to State College in 2014, and won the league's championship. In 2015, he was promoted to manage Palm Beach, and he managed Palm Beach for the 2016 season as well.

The Cardinals named Marmol their first base coach before the 2017 season. Before the 2019 season, the Cardinals shifted Marmol to bench coach. On October 25, 2021, he was promoted to manager of the Cardinals.

In 2022, at 35 years of age he was the youngest manager in Major League Baseball, five years younger than the next-youngest manager.

Managerial record

Personal life
Marmol is a Christian. Marmol is married to Amber Marmol and they have one daughter together. Marmol has two brothers who are both pastors. He and his wife have taken short-term missions to orphanages in Guatemala and Nicaragua.

References

External links

1986 births
Living people
Baseball players from Orlando, Florida
College of Charleston Cougars baseball players
Batavia Muckdogs players
St. Louis Cardinals coaches
Swing of the Quad Cities players
Palm Beach Cardinals players
Major League Baseball first base coaches
Dr. Phillips High School alumni
Major League Baseball bench coaches